Burl Ives' Animal Folk (Disneyland ST 3920, 1963) is one of several albums for children by the folk singer Burl Ives.

There is a full-color booklet inserted between the gatefold covers of this album. The booklet is lavishly illustrated with selected song lyrics and cartoon representations of Ives interacting with the animals in the songs. The illustrator is not identified, but was likely a Disney staff artist.

Although intended for children, the album is notable for its many references to the death, loss of or danger to the characters in the songs (see below for a breakdown).

Ten of the songs from Animal Folk were released as A Day at the Zoo with Burl Ives (Disneyland 1347) in 1972.

Wayfarer Music, the copyright holder of many of the songs in 1963, was a company started by Ives. It is now administered by his widow.

Track listing

Side 1

Side 2

References

1963 albums
Burl Ives albums
Disneyland Records albums
Children's music albums by American artists